Mark Farley (born April 5, 1963) is an American football coach. He is the head coach at the University of Northern Iowa, a position he has held since 2001. Farley started at inside linebacker at Northern Iowa from 1983 to 1985. He led the team in tackles in 1984 and 1985, was named Gateway Football Conference Co-Defensive Player of the Year in 1985, first team all-conference three times, earned honorable mention All-America honors twice and twice named Academic All-American. 

He then became an assistant at Northern Iowa. In 1989, he was named linebackers coach by new head coach Terry Allen. In 1997, he followed Allen to the University of Kansas, but left in 2001 when the head coaching position at his alma mater opened up.  Acting as his own defensive coordinator, Farley's squads perennially rank among the top defense teams in the NCAA Football Championship Subdivision. In early 2008, Farley served as the interim director of athletics at Northern Iowa. With a win over in-state rival Iowa State on September 3, 2016, Farley passed Northern Iowa legend Stan Sheriff in all-time wins as a football coach. Farley notched his 150th Northern Iowa career win with a home victory over Southern Utah on September 7, 2019.

Head coaching record

See also
 List of college football coaches with 150 NCAA Division I FCS wins

References

External links
 Northern Iowa profile

1963 births
Living people
American football linebackers
Kansas Jayhawks football coaches
Northern Iowa Panthers football players
Northern Iowa Panthers football coaches
People from Waukon, Iowa